Donald George Ruffin (born February 21, 2002), known professionally as Duwap Kaine is an American rapper, singer, and songwriter from Savannah, Georgia, also known for his projects Underdog, After the Storm, and Hardhead, as well as his early collaborations with record producer Pi'erre Bourne.

Early life 
Duwap was born in Savannah, Georgia.

Career 
During the beginnings of his career under Duwap Kaine, he uploaded one of his first singles "A Stove Is a Stove" on SoundCloud to a modest viral hit, crossing over a million plays due to sampling SpongeBob. With production support from Pi'erre Bourne, created another SoundCloud hit, with one of them being "Santa", which is his highest streamed track to date. In September 2017, he was labeled by American rapper Lil Yachty as one of his favorite rappers.

Duwap released his debut album, Underdog, on July 4, 2018. In March 2019, he released a single titled "Flyin", then in August 2019, he released a single titled "Epic Fail". In June 2022, he released his project Faith Like Esther.

Musical style 
He is known for using samples from the show SpongeBob in his earlier songs.

Discography

Studio albums 
Forever Kaine (2017)
Underdog (2018)
Bad Kid From the 4 (2020)
Underdog 2 (2020)
Thank You Kaine (2020)
After the Storm (2021)
After the Storm (Deluxe Version) (2021)
Hardhead (2021)
A Dogg's Influence (2022)
Faith Like Esther (2022)
Kaine's Diary (2022)
Family Guy (2022)
Underdog 3 (2022)
Old Files (2022)
Warning B4 Destruction (2022)
Remember Who Started The Wave (2023)

References

External links 
 

Living people
21st-century American rappers
2002 births
Alternative R&B musicians
African-American male rappers
People from Georgia (U.S. state)